Agni is a 1978 Indian Malayalam film, directed by C. Radhakrishnan and produced by Hassan and P. M. K. Bapu. The film stars Madhu, Vidhubala, Sankaradi and Aboobacker in the lead roles. The film's musical score is by A. T. Ummer.

Cast 
Madhu 
Vidhubala 
MOHANLAL 
 Aboobacker
Bahadoor 
Balan K. Nair 
MOHANLAL

Soundtrack 
The music was composed by A. T. Ummer and the lyrics were written by Sakunthala Rajendran.

References

External links
 

1978 films
1970s Malayalam-language films